In medicine, in particular, in emergency medicine, the log roll or logrolling is a maneuver used to move a patient without flexing the spinal column. Patient's  legs are stretched, the head is held, to immobilize the neck. 

Some sources recommend patient's arms  crossed over the chest, while others suggest that to minimize the amount of lateral spinal displacement the arms must be stretched along the sides, with palms resting on the thighs.  

After that the patient is carefully rolled in the desired direction without twisting or bending the body.

Typically logrolling  into a supine position is used for transport of a casualty. Other cases include logrolling on a side, e.g., to facilitate vomiting., or from side to side, for medical examination.

See also
 Casualty lifting

References

Emergency medical procedures